Theocris saga is a species of beetle in the family Cerambycidae, and the only species in the genus Theocris. It was described by Thomson in 1858.

References

Theocridini
Beetles described in 1858